Silene fernandezii is a species of plant in the family Caryophyllaceae. It is endemic to Spain.  Its natural habitat is rocky areas. It is threatened by habitat loss.

References

fernandezii
Endemic flora of Spain
Endemic flora of the Iberian Peninsula
Endangered plants
Taxonomy articles created by Polbot